IMP stands for the Information Module Profile. It is a specification put out by Sun Microsystems for the use of Java on embedded devices with very limited displays. It is a subset of the Mobile Information Device Profile.

IMP is part of the Java ME framework.

Noteworthy Limitations 

 No API for displays

General APIs 

The core APIs are defined by the underlying Configuration CLDC.

javax.microedition.io 

Contains the Java 2 Platform, Micro Edition specific classes used for I/O operations.

javax.microedition.rms 

Provides a form of persistent storage for Java 2 Platform, Micro Edition.

javax.microedition.midlet 

Contains the base classes for Java 2 Platform, Micro Edition applications.

External links 

The IMP Specification

Java device platform
Sun Microsystems software